Skip Sempé (born 1958 in New Orleans) is an American harpsichordist and conductor of the ensemble Capriccio Stravagante.

Selected discography
 Lully: divertissements - highlights from tragédie lyrique and comédie ballet. Guillemette Laurens Capriccio Stravagante. Skip Sempé DHM

References

External links
 Discography

American harpsichordists
1958 births
Living people